Pozuelo is a municipality in Albacete, Castile-La Mancha, Spain. It has a population of 672. It is the home of the parish church of 
San Bartolomé.

Municipalities of the Province of Albacete